Theodoros Ryuki Kamekura Panagopoulos, known as Theo Ryuki or Theo Japa (born 31 July 1995) is a Japanese-Greek former professional footballer. He also holds Brazilian citizenship.

Career
He made his professional debut in the Segunda Liga for Portimonense on 11 December 2013 in a game against Chaves. 

He left the club after the 2018–19 season and subsequently retired from football, instead pursuing a career as a sports agent. He has since represented players such as Shoya Nakajima. In May 2021, he was mentioned as a suspect surrounding the falsification of a COVID-19 test of Nakajima.

References

1995 births
Brazilian people of Japanese descent
Brazilian people of Greek descent
Living people
Japanese footballers
Japanese expatriate footballers
Japanese people of Greek descent
Expatriate footballers in Portugal
Portimonense S.C. players
Liga Portugal 2 players
Association football midfielders
Association football agents